Owen Chiedozie Nwokolo is an Anglican bishop in Nigeria: he is the current Bishop on the Niger, one of nine within the Anglican Province of the Niger, itself one of 14 provinces within the Church of Nigeria.

Notes

Living people
Anglican bishops on the Niger
21st-century Anglican bishops in Nigeria
Year of birth missing (living people)